Primerigonina is a monotypic genus of Central American sheet weavers containing the single species, Primerigonina australis. It was first described by J. Wunderlich in 1995, and has only been found in Panama.

See also
 List of Linyphiidae species (I–P)

References

Linyphiidae
Monotypic Araneomorphae genera
Spiders of Central America